Events in the year 2021 in Croatia.

Incumbents 
 President: Zoran Milanović 
 Prime Minister: Andrej Plenković

Events 
Ongoing — COVID-19 pandemic in Croatia

January 
January 2 – National day of mourning due to the 2020 Petrinja earthquake.
January 5 – National day of mourning due to the 2021 Tribistovo poisoning.

Scheduled events 
25 to 31 January – Scheduled date for the 2021 European Figure Skating Championships, which were to be held in Zagreb. In December 2020 it was announced that the ISU Council had decided to cancel the championships due to increasing risks in view of the worldwide COVID-19 pandemic.

16 May – the 2021 Croatian local elections.

Deaths

January 

January 4 – , general and war commander of the defence of Dubrovnik (b. 1948).
January 20 – Mira Furlan, actress and singer (b. 1955).
January 31 – Miroslav Tuđman, scientist and politician (b. 1946).

February 
 
February 1 – Đuro Savinović, water polo player (b. 1950).
February 12 – Mladen Vranković, football player and manager (b. 1937).
February 21 – Zlatko Saračević, handball player and coach (b. 1961).
February 28 – Milan Bandić, politician and mayor of Zagreb (b. 1955).

March 
 
March 1 – Zlatko Kranjčar, football player and manager (b. 1956).
March 8 – Josip Alebić, sprinter (b. 1947).
March 10 – Mirko Bazić, football player and manager (b. 1938).

April 
 April 29 – Bogdan Žižić, film director and screenwriter (b. 1934).

May 
 May 4 – , actor and producer (b. 1968).

August 
 August 8 – Aleksej Demjanov, gymnast (b. 1973).

September 
 September 15 – Žana Lelas, basketball player (b. 1970).

October 
 October 21 – Žarko Potočnjak, actor (b. 1946).

December 
 December 3 – , singer (b. 1967).

References 

 
2020s in Croatia
Years of the 21st century in Croatia
Croatia
Croatia